Freaky Deaky Music Festival is held on October 30 – November 1 in Chicago, Illinois to celebrate Halloween. The festival was founded by React Presents in 2008, which began a big Halloween party featuring carnival rides, games, costume contests, art, music and more. The festival has featured a range of artists including Bassnectar, Pretty lights, Carnage, and Keys n Krates.

References

External links 
 Freaky Deaky Music Festival
 React Presents

Music festivals in Chicago
Halloween events in the United States